The Punisher drone is a small fixed-wing reusable aircraft used by front-line infantry to strike military targets. It came to prominence in the lead-up to the 2022 Russian invasion of Ukraine. It is manufactured by UA Dynamics. All systems are made with non-Ukraine-government funds and are given to the Special Operations Forces of the Armed Forces of Ukraine free of charge. Spectre, a smaller drone, identifies targets. It requires 15 minutes preparation, needs 7 minutes turnaround, has a 7.5-foot wingspan, a four-pound payload, a 29-mile strike range, a flight speed of 44-miles per hour, can fly for several hours, at 1,300-feet elevation. UA Dynamics offers "to send a written message on the bombs it drops" via crowdfunding. UA Dynamics was founded by veterans of the Crimean annexation.

References

International unmanned aerial vehicles
Low-altitude low-endurance unmanned aerial vehicles
Unmanned military aircraft of Ukraine
2020s Ukrainian military aircraft
Unmanned aerial vehicles of Ukraine